Vangelis Protopappas (1917 – 21 May 1995) was a Greek actor from Messolongi. He is most known for his roles in A Hero in His Slippers, Santa Chikita and The Counterfeit Coin. He later took roles in a number of TV shows including Astynomos Thanassis Papathanassis with Thanassis Vengos and Zoza Metaxa.

Biography

Vangelis Protopappas was from a family with a strong legal history. His father Dimitrios Protopappas was a city judge and a politician. Protopappas died on 21 May 1995 from Alzheimer's disease at the age of 78. He is buried at the Kallithea Cemetery.

Filmography

References

External links

1917 births
1995 deaths
Greek male actors
People from Tinos
20th-century Greek male actors